Pohick is a toponym in Northern Virginia derived from the Algonquian (Pohick language) word for the "water place."  It can refer to:

Pohick (tribe), historical Algonquian-speaking tribe, part of Powhatan Confederacy
Pohick language, part of Algonquian family
Pohick Bay
Pohick Church
Pohick Creek
Pohick Road
Pohick, Virginia
Pohick, West Virginia